Soldatov's thicklip gudgeon (Sarcocheilichthys soldatovi) is a species of cyprinid fish found from the Amur to the Liaoning drainages, and Buir Lake in Mongolia.

Named in honor of ichthyologist Vladimir Konstantinovich Soldatov (1875-1941), who collected type specimen.

References

Sarcocheilichthys
Taxa named by Lev Berg
Fish described in 1914